Vettikkattiri  is a village in Malappuram district in the state of Kerala, India.

Demographics
 India census, Vettikkattiri had a population of 17641 with 8554 males and 9087 females.

Transportation
Vettikkattiri village connects to other parts of India through Manjeri .  National Highway No.66 passes through Parappanangadi and the northern stretch connects to Goa and Mumbai.  The southern stretch connects to Cochin and Trivandrum. National Highway No.966 connects to Palakkad and Coimbatore.  The nearest airport is at Kozhikode.  The nearest major railway station is at Tirur.

References

   Villages in Malappuram district
Manjeri